Physical & Occupational Therapy in Geriatrics is a peer-reviewed medical journal that acts as a forum for allied health professionals as well as others with a focus on prevention and rehabilitation of health conditions in older adults and share information on clinical experience, research, and therapeutic practice. It is published by Taylor & Francis and edited by Edgar Ramos Vieira.

References

External links 
 

Gerontology journals
Quarterly journals
Taylor & Francis academic journals
Publications established in 1981
English-language journals